Shuttle Inc. (TAIEX:2405) is a Taiwan-based manufacturer of motherboards, barebone computers, complete PC systems and monitors. Throughout the last 10 years, Shuttle has been one of the world's top 10 motherboard manufacturers, and gained fame in 2001 with the introduction of the Shuttle SV24, one of the world's first commercially successful small form factor computers. Shuttle XPC small form factor computers tend to be popular among PC enthusiasts and hobbyists, although in 2004 Shuttle started a campaign to become a brand name recognized by mainstream PC consumers.

Shuttle XPC desktop systems are based on same PC platform as the XPC barebone (case+motherboard+power supply) Shuttle manufactures. More recently, the differentiation between Shuttle barebones and Shuttle systems has become greater, with the launch of system exclusive models such as the M-series and X-series.

History
 1983 – Shuttle was initially incorporated in Taiwan by David and Simon Yu under the name Holco (浩鑫), and commences trading of computer motherboards.
 1984 – Holco begins manufacturing motherboards in its Taoyuan County (now Taoyuan City), Taiwan factory.
 1988 – Holco establishes its first overseas branch office, in Fremont, California.
 1990 – Holco subsidiary Shuttle Computer Handel is established in Elmshorn, Germany to serve European market.
 1994 – Introduces Shuttle RiscPC 4475, a desktop based on DEC Alpha 64-bit microprocessor and Microsoft Windows NT for Alpha.
 1995 – Shuttle reaches #5 motherboard manufacturer worldwide in terms of volume.
 1997 – Holco officially changes its name to Shuttle Inc.
 2000 – Goes public on TAIEX stock market under symbol 2405.
 2001 – Introduces Shuttle SV24, a compact all-aluminum computer using desktop components.
 2002 – SV24 evolves into XPC line of small form factor barebones computers, including models for Intel's Pentium 4 and AMD's Athlon.
 2003 – 8 different XPCs introduced, including models featuring chipsets from Nvidia, Intel, SiS, and VIA.
 2004 – XPC shipments pass 1 million, Shuttle introduces the XP17 LCD and fully assembled PC systems. Branch offices established in Japan and China.
 2005 – PC World awards Shuttle the "World Class" and "Best Buy" awards.
 2005 – IDC research ranks the Shuttle brand loyalty higher than Dell, Sony and Apple.
 2005 – Shuttle introduces the world's first small-form-factor Nvidia SLi system.
 2005 – Introduction of Shuttle's first exclusive set-top box living-room PC, the M1000.
 2005 – Shuttle debuts the world's fastest ultra-small-form-factor PC - the X100.
 2006 – Shuttle is selected as one of Intel's premiere partners when Intel Viiv launched at the International Consumer Electronics Show (CES) in Las Vegas.
 2006 – Shuttle launches a series of new chassis, X series and T series, which offers variety shapes of PC.
 2006 – PCWORLD selects the Shuttle as the 15th great landmark in PC history.
 2007 – Shuttle introduces new lineup of extreme gaming PC, SDXi system. Features Intel Core 2 Extreme processor and water cooling system.  
 2007 – Shuttle Computers introduces the first SFF Workstation line with Intel Xeon Processors.
 2007 – Shuttle introduces XPC G5 3300m System, features the world's first and the only supports the dual HD 1080 formats optical drive.
 2007 – Shuttle introduces XPC Glamor, Prima and D'VO series.
 2007 – BCN awards Shuttle the "Top Prize" in the "Barebone PC" category, a market share of 44.2 percent. Most prestigious Japanese award for IT companies.
 2008 – Shuttle implements "Green" features into PC lineup.
 2008 – Shuttle debuts its first Surveillance concept product. 
 2009 – Shuttle launches X50, its first All-in-one PC.
 2009 – Shuttle develops its first Home Automation product.
 2009 – Shuttle develops its first IPC product.
 2010 – Shuttle establishes OEM business unit to launch mobile solutions. 
 2010 – Shuttle debuts the world's first successful notebook ecosystem - the Shuttle Notebook Ecosystem.
 2010 – Introduction of first online notebook ordering system - eSPA.
 2010 – Shuttle launches fanless 1-Liter PC series, XS35.
 2011 – Introduction of BTR, its "Build-To-Request" solution to the PC industry. 
 2011 – Intel names Shuttle a "Platinum" technology provider, the highest recognition. 
 2011 – NVIDIA names Shuttle a "Premier" partner in North America, the highest recognition.

Products
From 1987 to 2004, Shuttle manufactured AT, Baby AT, ATX, and Micro ATX motherboards. Among Shuttle's most popular motherboards were the HOT-603 Socket 7 motherboard based on the AMD640 chipset, and the AK31 Socket A motherboard based on the VIA KT266 and KT266A chipsets.

Currently, Shuttle's primary product is the XPC. The Shuttle XPC's design goal is to provide the power and features of a typical desktop PC in a fraction of the space. The XPC consists of a custom small-footprint motherboard, a rectangular chassis typically consisting of aluminum, a "Shuttle ICE" heatpipe-augmented heatsink, and a compact power supply. Popular XPCs include the SS51G, the SN41G2, and the SN25P. Shuttle XPC barebones can be found worldwide from PC distributors, retailers, and e-commerce stores. In 2004, the Shuttle XPC was the official PC of the World Cyber Games.

In 2004, Shuttle began manufacturing fully assembled PC systems. As of 2007, Shuttle XPC systems are available in the United States only at Sam's Club as well as Shuttle's US website. Shuttle systems are also available in Europe, Taiwan, China and Japan.

The Shuttle XP17 is a portable 17" LCD introduced in 2004 and surprisingly, is still being sold today at a premium. The XP17 is targeted at LAN gaming and other activities requiring a portable, high performance monitor. The XP17 won the Red dot award for industrial design in June 2005.

Models
Current Models
 T-series 
 X-series 
 M-series
 P2-series
 P3-series 
 G5-series
 G2-series 
 H7 series 
 J1 series 
 J2 series 
 J3 series 
 J4 series

Laptop standardization proposal
At the 2010 Consumer Electronics Show Shuttle unveiled a proposal called Shuttle PCB Assembly (SPA) to standardize motherboard size and layouts for laptop computers. Computer Shopper magazine said this was one of the top ten announcements for innovation made at 2010 CES.

Awards
In 2009, CNet praised one of Shuttle's new machines for allowing full sized graphics cards while still maintaining a small form factor.

See also
 List of companies of Taiwan

References

External links
 
 Interview with Ken Huang, chief XPC architect.
 Interview with Jack Wang, USA president of Shuttle.

Companies established in 1983
Motherboard companies
Companies based in Taipei
Taiwanese brands
Electronics companies of Taiwan